Mental health inequality refers to the differences in the quality, access, and health care different communities and populations receive for mental health services. Globally, the World Health Organization estimates that 350 million people are affected with depressive disorders. Mental health can be defined as an individual's well-being and/or the absence of clinically defined mental illness. Inequalities that can occur in mental healthcare may include mental health status, access to and quality of care, and mental health outcomes, which may differ across populations of different race, ethnicity, sexual orientation, sex, gender, socioeconomic statuses, education level, and geographic location. Social determinants of health, more specifically the social determinants of mental health, that can influence an individual's susceptibility to developing mental disorders and illnesses include, but are not limited to, economic status, education level, demographics, geographic location and genetics.

Disparities in accessing and quality of mental health care 
There is a growing unmet need for mental health services and equity in the quality of these services. While these services often advertise themselves as being a support system and caregiver for any and all who need treatment or support, oftentimes certain aspects of an individual's life, such as race, ethnicity, and sexual orientation, will determine the access and quality of care that they are given.

Due to a growing level of socioeconomic inequality among races, African Americans are less likely to have access to mental health care and are more likely to have lesser quality care when they do find it. African Americans and Hispanics are more likely to be uninsured or have Medicaid, limiting the amount and type of access that they have mental health outpatient sources. In one study, of all those who received mental health care, minority populations reported a higher degree of unmet needs and dissatisfaction with the services they were given (12.5% of whites, 25.4% of African Americans, and 22.6% of Hispanics reported poor care).

In addition, mental illnesses are often under and over diagnosed among different minority groups for various reasons. For example, schizophrenia is often over diagnosed in African Americans, whereas mood disorders, depression, and anxiety are under diagnosed. This serves as an example of how minority groups in the United States, such as African Americans, are at risk of being diagnosed based on stereotype and not properly assessed or treated for other mental health conditions that they may or may not be at risk for.

The LGBTQ population, while still open to the same disparities as racial minority groups, is often confronted with the problem of being denied mental health treatment because of the gender they identify as or their sexual orientation. In a study conducted by The National Center for Transgender Equality and the National Gay and Lesbian Task Force, 19% of the LGBTQ sample reported being denied the healthcare they needed. In addition, 28% of the sample reported being harassed or even physically assaulted during the health visit. While denial of treatment and harassment during treatment are large causes of the disparities among mental health care quality, the lack of knowledge is also of concern among the LGBTQ population. As it is such a newly developing field of study, there is very little knowledge or research conducted that relate specifically to LGBTQ health and healthcare. Because of this, about 50% of the LGBTQ population report having to teach aspects of their health and treatment to the health care providers.

Socioeconomic status disparities 

Lack of socioeconomic resources can lead to development of traumatic experiences that precipitate into mental health disorders. For example, not having employment or having limited access to resources can influence the course of developing some of the most common mental health disorders, such as depression, anxiety, bipolar disorder, and psychological stress. Living with a mental health disorder can also contribute to disparities in receiving mental health care. Living with a mental health disorder could affect an individual's economic status, which can additionally lead into their mental health quality as well as life expectancy.

Another socioeconomic factor that can lead to barriers and inequalities in accessing mental health care services include financial restraints. There has been a rise in cost for uninsured individuals in accessing mental health care services compared to individuals who have private or public insurance.

Education disparities 
Educational disparities can be defined as unjust or unfair differences in educational outcomes that can be a result of difference in treatment of certain minority groups in schools, varying socioeconomic statuses, and varying educational needs. These disparities in education can ultimately lead to issues of mental health. When this happens, less privileged groups get looped into the cascading effects of inequality.

Disparities in education, contributory to socioeconomic status, immigrant status, and ethnic/racial status can be another contributing factor to mental health inequality. Socioeconomic status plays a large role in the difference in access to educational resources. School districts are split geographically. Because the current funding for public schools comes from local property taxes, there is more incentive for high-status individuals to narrow the boundaries to not include lower income families from their school districts. Because each school district is then only encompassing one socioeconomic group, the programs and quality are affected. This is where we begin to see the dramatic differences between school districts. While some schools offer amazing guidance departments, advanced classes, and phenomenal facilities, other areas struggle to find qualified and motivated teachers to teach basic classes. Although public education is something that is supposed to be a right for all, an individual's socioeconomic status can greatly affect the quality of that education.

An individual's immigration status also affects the quality of education received. While there are some immigrant groups which do well after immigrating to the United States, many do not have the same level of success. There are many barriers that prevent the academic success of immigrant children. These barriers include but are not limited to the fact that most parents of immigrant children do not understand the United States educational system, inadequate English as a Second Language programs, and segregation. There are also differences in outcomes across immigrant generation, with first-generation immigrants performing better than subsequent generations. This is termed the immigrant paradox. These issues along with the psychological effects of acculturation (e.g., adapting to a whole new country, language, and culture) amplify educational inequality.

Disparities in education are the insufficiency of resources that are included but limited. These disparities usually targets socially excluded communities with low income. Statistics are used when measuring grades, GPA, test scores, and dropout rates to determine the success of students. By creating a system in which a person could never succeed can perpetuate inequalities, especially those suffering from mental health.

Spatial disparities (geographic location) 
Spatial disparities include, but are not limited to, where one lives, spends most of their time, where they receive most of their resources, and where they receive education. For example, minority races who live in higher poverty neighborhoods are at higher risk for additional stresses and mental health disorders. Yet this population has been shown to experience more difficulties in accessing mental health services. Considering this cycle of needing care but not being able to receive care, inequality due to spatial location will likely remain and continue to limit access to mental health care without additional intervention to increase access to mental health services.

Many minorities including African Americans, Hispanics, and Asian Americans inhabit these poverty filled neighborhoods due to factors being not in their favor in certain aspects of society. These neighborhoods lack resources such as offices with psychiatrists or health clinics with good doctors who are trained to help those in need of mental health care. It would also be beneficial to make specific services just for those in high-poverty neighborhoods who lack the resources so we can encourage those in need to get the help that they deserve. With adjustments made to meet these circumstances, the spatial disparities can be lowered and allow those who need the help to get it.

Ethnic and racial disparities and predictors

There is inequality in mental health care access for different races and ethnicities. Studies have shown that minorities with low-income have less access to mental health care than low-income non-Latino whites. In addition to lack of access, minorities in the United States were more likely to receive poorer quality in mental health care and treatment compared to non-Latino whites individuals, leading to many minorities delaying or failing treatment.  Studies have shown the African Americans have decrease access to mental health services and mental health care compared non-Latino white Americans. Many minorities have difficulty in finding care for mental health services.

The historical events that took place in the United States against African Americans have resulted in a distrust in the healthcare system. The stigma of mental healthcare in the African American community has caused an increased prevalence of these disorders as surveys have found that 12 million women and 7 million men suffer from some kind of mental health illness. Besides being the most vulnerable race to contract the Covid-19 virus, they also presented a higher incidence of mental health disorders. Research has shown that this community reacts better to treatment when it is offered by healthcare professionals as an alternative to other treatments. When considering why African Americans are so at-risk for mental health issues, it is important to consider how their race impacts their daily lives. Black individuals in this country still face discrimination, which leads to negative emotions, and these emotions could include feelings of social isolation. Not only are they made to feel as though they are not fully a part of our society, but they may also feel as though their non-black family members and friends do not fully understand their struggles. This could definitely lead to subjective social isolation, or a lack of feeling close to other people. One study revealed that subjective social isolation in African Americans is correlated to having any 12-month disorder listed in the DSM and to having a higher number of 12-month disorders listed in the DSM. Based on this reasoning, subjective social isolation could be one of the reasons why African Americans are an at-risk group when it comes to mental health struggles, and it would definitely make sense for this subjective social isolation to be a result of racism that still exists today. It is also important to consider the intersectionality of race and gender when thinking about mental health. The same study as mentioned above states that African American men are more likely to experience social isolation than African American women, which could make black men in this country even more at-risk for psychiatric disorders. When thinking about the racism in this country, this somewhat makes sense, because black men experience certain aspects of discrimination that are specific to their group. For example, African American men are often perceived as dangerous and have high rates of being arrested. When all of these risk factors are then combined with the stigma that all men face in terms of discussing mental health issues, this puts African American men at a very high risk for both developing psychiatric disorders and not feeling empowered enough to talk about their struggles. When we are talking about racial disparities in mental health, not only do we need to acknowledge the lack of access that minority groups have to the proper health care, but we also need to understand that being in a minority racial group puts individuals at a higher risk for developing psychiatric disorders in the first place. Then, it is crucial to consider some of the possible reasons for this and begin to ask how we could decrease the disparities in this country. All minority groups are especially at-risk for mental health issues, including racial minority groups, and this is linked to systemic racism.

During the early 2010's the Latino Community experienced an increase in cases of mental health disorders. Studies have shown that Latinos are more likely to present early symptoms of mental health disorders than non Latino-whites. Among Latinos, those without a legal status in the United States suffer a higher burden of being diagnose with a mental health disorders as their journey to the country has caused them to experience traumatizing events including sexual abuse, kidnapping, and the constant fear of deportation. Consequently, undocumented Latinos have a lower access to mental healthcare than U.S born Latinos because of the current political restrictions against this community.

After surveying individuals of different races, a study has shown that African Americans, Hispanics, and Asian Americans gain less access to the same type of mental services that non-minority whites get access to. A possible reason that the author stated:

"This theory postulates that Whites have a greater propensity to avoid living in poverty communities because they are more likely to enjoy social and economic advantages. Only seriously mentally ill Whites suffer from steep downward mobility and come to reside in high-poverty neighborhoods".

Minorities have an absence of mental health support within their communities as a result of stigmas and stereotypes applied to those pursuing mental health guidance. Another barrier to the shortage of mental health support is the lack of this type of healthcare available because of the rural settings that contain a high population of minorities. External environmental factors, such as family, community, and work, can influence the inclination to reach out for mental health counseling.

This has been a problem for minority races that need the same services. It is an issue because African Americans, Hispanics, and Asian Americans need the services more in certain areas due to how biologically certain minority races are more likely to be diagnosed with a mental illness than whites.

Problems can extend to the point of racial beliefs of health professionals and researchers influencing the diagnoses and treatments developed for some communities. James Burgess Waldram wrote a 2004 text Revenge of the Windigo (the title referring to "Wendigo psychosis", which he asserts is an artificial construction of anthropologists and psychologists) discussing the behavioral health industry's difficulties successfully analyzing and treating the needs of indigenous people in the United States and Canada.

Race is often difficult to acknowledge in mental health. Even when access to mental health therapies exists for minorities, oftentimes both the therapist and the patient can be reluctant to factor their own racial positioning into treatment or find it difficult to believe that some of their mental health stress is due to race. Both often favor explanations rooted in past experiences like family life, personal setbacks, and other potential barriers.

LGBTQ disparities and predictors 

Sexuality plays a large role in the prediction of mental illnesses and overall mental health. Those who identify as lesbian, gay, bisexual, transgender, and/or queer have a higher risk of having mental health issues, most likely as a result of the continued discrimination and victimization they receive at the hands of others. Members of this population are confronted with derogatory and hateful comments, whether through face-to-face communication or through social media, which affects their self-worth and confidence, leading to anxiety, depression, thoughts of suicide, suicide attempts, and suicide. These mental health effects are most commonly seen among adolescents, however, they are also prevalent among adults of all ages. The sources of discrimination and victimization that the LGBTQ population suffers from can be both external and internal. While parts of society today are not accepting of the LGBTQ community and make public statements to advertise their discontent, an identifying LGBTQ can also have low confidence and a lack of self-worth that furthers these negative mental health effects.

The most notable predictor of mental health illnesses among the LGBTQ population is family acceptance.  Those of the LGBTQ population who receive little or no family support and acceptance are three times more likely to have thoughts of suicide than those who do have a strong family support system behind them. Oftentimes, the lack of familial support is more conducive of detrimental behaviors, such as drug and illegal substance abuse, which can cause further harm to the individual. Multiple aspects of lifestyles, including religion, can affect family support. Those who have strong family ties to religion may be less likely to seek support and help from family members due to fear of a lack of acceptance within the family, as well as within the religious community.

Although mental health awareness has increased for the LGBTQ+ community, the aging citizens of this community are still struggling to have their voices heard. Research has shown that compared to heterosexuals and other groups in the LGBTQ+ community, older people have a higher incidence of suffering from mental health disorder. One of the most common reasons why older citizens refrain from seeking mental health care is due to the past discrimination by medical professionals. In addition to the lack of knowledge, this group is marginalized due to the lack of funding as most of the funds go to campaigns for the younger LGBTQ+ population.

Sex and gender disparities and predictors 
While gender differences among those with mental health disorders are an underdeveloped field of study, there are gender specific aspects to life that cause disparities. Gender is often a determinant of the amount of power one has over factors in their life, such as socioeconomic status and social position, and the stressors that go along with these factors. The location of genders and sex within the social construct can be a great determinant of risks and predictors of mental health disorders. These disparities in gender can correlate to the disparities in the types of mental health disorders that individuals have. While all genders and sexes are at risk of a large variety of mental health illnesses, some illnesses and disorders are more common among one sex than another. Women are twice as likely as men to be diagnosed with forms of depression as depressive disorders account for close to 41.9% of the disability from neuropsychiatric disorders among women compared to 29.3% among men. On the other hand, men are three times more likely to be given a diagnosis of a social anxiety disorder than women.

Sex can also be a determinant of other aspects of mental health as well. The time of onset of symptoms can be different dependent on one's sex. Women are more likely to show signs of mental illnesses, such as depression, earlier and at a younger age than men. Many believe this to be a correlation with the onset time of puberty. As a result of social stigmas and stereotypes within society, women are also more likely to be prescribed mood-altering medications, whereas men are more likely to be prescribed medications for addictions. Further research on the mental health disparities among sex and gender is needed in order to gain a deeper knowledge of the predictors of mental health and the possible differences in treatments.

Adult women are at a high risk of experiencing mental health disorders during their pregnancy, however, most physicians do not address this until the postpartum period. With anxiety and depression being the most common ones, these disorders can affect both the pregnant woman and the baby's life. [6] The most common reasons for mental health disorders in this community were domestic abuse, fear of loneliness and previous medical history of mental disorders. The Covid-19 pandemic was a difficult time for those who were pregnant as isolation, one of the main causes for anxiety and depression, was mandated. Studies showed that during the pandemic, while the mental health of middle class pregnant women living in New York City improved, pregnant women living under a low socioeconomic status were more vulnerable to suffer from psychological disorders.

Current initiatives in achieving mental health equality 
Because mental health inequality is largely due to disparities in health insurance, ways to improve mental health equity must come from changes in healthcare policies. Much of mental health disparity comes from a lack of access to healthcare in low socioeconomic communities and, often, underprivileged minorities. This lack of access can arise from geographic isolation, poor funding and incentive for health care providers, inefficient health care coverage or highly stigmatized and discriminatory community attitudes surrounding mental health. Also, changing the content of healthcare literature and education to include mental health is equally important. The United States has made strides to break down the stigmas surrounding mental health, but the rate of such stigma is currently still on the rise. Potentially linked to such high stigma and miseducation, mental health is also still not considered to be a significant part of basic health care plans. In order for individuals to receive the treatment necessary for mental illness, it must be first acknowledged as a real, treatable illness.

In May 2013, the World Health Assembly adopted a new action plan to address mental health over the following 8 years. This plan is called the Comprehensive Mental Health Action Plan 2013-2020. This plan is an indicator of the global importance of mental health and includes goals for global mental health improvement. This plan also addresses mental health inequalities by acknowledging the need for greater access in low and middle-income countries.

Global mental health inequalities 
There is major inequality in the mental health field on a global scale, especially in developing countries. The number of people with a mental health condition is substantial, while clinicians are underappreciated and under resourced.

Around 30% of people globally suffer from a mental disorder in any given year, and more than two thirds of those individuals do not receive the necessary care. The most common mental health disorders globally are depression, alcohol and substance abuse, and psychosis. The consequences of mental health inequalities include unneeded suffering and premature death, increased stigma and marginalization, a lack of investment in mental health workforce and infrastructure and limited or no treatment for people suffering from these conditions.

The burden of unmet mental health needs perpetuates a cycle of inequalities that impact a person’s overall health and wellbeing. Many developing countries lack policies that address the basic needs and rights of people suffering from mental illnesses. According to research, patients in developing countries frequently leave hospitals without knowing their diagnosis or what medications they are taking, they wait too long for referrals, appointments, and treatment, and they are not respected or given adequate emotional support.

There is astounding disparity that exists between the prevalence of mental problems around the world and the resources available for mental health. Globally, only 2% of national budgets are devoted to mental health. Due to a lack of finances and the ability to adequately treat their patients, some nations merely have warehouses to serve as hospitals where patients are isolated from the rest of society. The few psychiatric hospitals that do exist in developing countries are frequently overcrowded, understaffed, and may not offer the necessary level of care. Most psychiatric hospitals are located in urban areas, away from family members, which increases social isolation and costs for families. Integrating mental health into primary health care could help solve these problems on a global scale.

Adolescents Mental Health 
Mental health is as an ongoing issue for adolescents. Researchers claim that preventing mental health problems, which commonly start in adolescence, is both doable and necessary. Schools have emerged as an target for involvement due to the high number of young people who experience mental health issues and the low number of those who have access to expensive and time-consuming therapies. Studies have demonstrated that preventative programs that take place in clinics or other healthcare settings are more beneficial to teenagers, despite the possibility that they may be successful in schools. Social media may be a valuable resource for young people who are socially isolated and who are struggling with mental health issues. But, especially in girls and underrepresented groups, social media use has also been related to sadness, suicide, and self-harm. 

By facilitating easier access to interventions and resources that have been scientifically proven effective as well as by simplifying some steps in the diagnostic, monitoring, and health indicators, digital technologies have the potential to revolutionize the way that services for young people with mental health issues are provided. There are many ways mental health can effects an adolescents directly and indirectly. Lower grades, conflicts with parents and a lack of social relationship are few of the indirect ways a child can be effects. Whereas, changes in mood states, is one sign of a direct affect of mental health on adolescents.

See also 
 Health equity
 Acculturation
 Immigrant paradox

References 

Mental health
Social problems in medicine
Social inequality
Health equity